Pierpont is an unincorporated community in Wyoming County, West Virginia, United States, along the Slab Fork and West Virginia Route 54.

The community was named after J. Pierpont Morgan.

References

Unincorporated communities in West Virginia
Unincorporated communities in Wyoming County, West Virginia